The University of Edinburgh Business School (known as the University of Edinburgh Management School until 2008; abbreviated as UEBS) is the business school of the University of Edinburgh in Scotland. The university has offered business education since 1918, and the MBA degree since 1980.  The business school is tied to the University of Edinburgh, which received its royal charter in 1582.

History 
In 1916, the University was encouraged by the Edinburgh Chamber of Commerce to consider instituting a degree suitable for study by its members. And so, in 1918, the Bachelor of Commerce (BCom) was launched. A year later, the Chair of Accounting and Business Method was founded, the first such Chair in Scotland. Originally part of the Faculty of Arts, these initiatives led to the creation of the Department of Business Studies and the Department of Accounting and Business Method. The BCom degree survived until the start of the 21st century before giving way to the Master of Arts (Scotland) (MA) in Business Studies.

The Master of Business Administration (MBA) was first offered in 1980, followed by the Part-time MBA in 1984. Since then, over 3,500 students from a wide variety of backgrounds, nationalities and business specialisms have completed these programmes. The first Master of Science (MSc) was launched in 1996.
In August 2010 the School relocated to a nearby building located at the heart of the University campus. This state-of-the-art building houses all school staff, features eight lecture theatres, multiple syndicate rooms, an executive education suite and a cafe. It represents an investment of £17 million by the University. Beyond the School and the University, Edinburgh itself has a wide array of venues, both historic and contemporary.

Research 

At the UEBS, numerous research centres and institutes have been established.
UEBS offers a wide range of business-oriented degrees at undergraduate and postgraduate levels.

A strong focus is put on the following fields of research:
 Accounting and Finance
 Entrepreneurship and Innovation
 Management Science and Business Economics
 Marketing
 Organisation Studies
 Strategy

Since 2005, the E Club promotes entrepreneurial activity and supports new venture creation.

Alumni 

 Chris Beard, former CEO of Mozilla (MBA 2004)
 Alan Jope, CEO of Unilever (BCom 2000)
 Susie Wolff, CEO of Venturi Racing (Attended, 2001)
 David Carnegie, 4th Duke of Fife (MBA 1990)
 Judy Murray, tennis coach (MBA 1981)

UEBS's global alumni network numbers around 16,000 members in over 120 countries. The students are advised and trained by the MBA careers advisors and/or the student development team in career, personal development and soft-skills issues.

Accreditation and Ranking Data 
UEBS is accredited by EQUIS, AMBA and AACSB. This gives the Business School triple crown accreditation. Some selected rankings are shown below:
 3rd for female students in Financial Times 2017 Global MBA Rankings
 35th in Financial Times Masters in Finance Pre-experience ranking 2017 
 59th in The Economist  MBA rankings 2020
 4th in student quality The Economist  MBA rankings 2020
 55th in QS Global MBA ranking 2022
 91st in Financial Times 2017 Global MBA Ranking

Tartan
 The University of Edinburgh Business School tartan is registered under the Scottish Register of Tartans, STA ref: 6107

See also
 List of business schools in Europe
 Business school
 Master of Business Administration
 University of Edinburgh

References

External links
 University of Edinburgh Business School website (Official website)

Business schools in Scotland
1918 establishments in Scotland
Educational institutions established in 1918
Schools of the University of Edinburgh